Bryan Hamilton (born 21 December 1946) is a Northern Irish former professional football player and manager. He gained 50 caps for Northern Ireland between 1969 and 1980, and later managed the national team for four years. He later became Technical Director at Antigua Barracuda F.C., which no longer exists, having been dissolved in 2014.

Biography

Playing career
Born in Belfast, Hamilton began his career at Distillery, before moving on to Linfield. He was named Ulster Footballer of the Year and Northern Ireland Football Writers' Association Player of the Year for the 1970/71 season, also finishing as Irish League top goalscorer. In 1971, he signed for Ipswich Town, where he spent five years and made over 150 appearances for the club. In 1976, he signed for Everton, before moving onto short spells at Millwall and Swindon Town.

In the FA Cup semi-final of 1977, full-time was looming in the clash between Everton and local rivals Liverpool at Maine Road, with the score at 2–2, when Hamilton put the ball into the back of the net. However, infamously, his goal which should have stood was disallowed by referee Clive Thomas and the match went to a replay, which Everton lost 3–0. This echoed an incident in the 1975 FA Cup semi-final replay, when Thomas had similarly disallowed a potentially match winning goal by Hamilton.

Everton supporters felt legitimately aggrieved to have victory snatched away

The FA Cup was shown on BBC and ITV in 1977 and the first game of the semi-final which was drawn 2–2 is also memorable for the fact that in a highlights programme the referee was asked to explain the disallowed 'goal' but he failed to explain and all he would say was.....There was an offence

Hamilton's time at Everton will always be remembered for that controversial disallowed goal in the FA Cup semi-final, however, when Hamilton signed for Everton the manager was another Northern Irishman Billy Bingham but when Bingham lost his job as manager Hamilton's first team opportunities became more and more limited

International goals
Scores and results list Northern Ireland's goal tally first.

Managerial career
Hamilton became player/manager of Tranmere Rovers in 1980. The club remained in the Fourth Division throughout this period, with three top half finishes during his five-year period in charge, culminating in a finish of 6th in 1984–85.

He was appointed manager of Wigan Athletic in March 1985. Shortly after joining he led them to victory in the 1985 Associate Members' Cup Final. The 1985–86 season saw Wigan emerge as contenders for promotion to the Second Division, a feat which looked likely for virtually the entire campaign. However, when Wigan had completed their fixtures Derby County had three games in hand, two of which would be won to pip the Latics by a single point. His achievements with Wigan did not go unnoticed, and he moved to Leicester City soon afterwards. However, he was unable to keep Leicester in the First Division and soon left the club, and returned to Wigan as manager from 1989–1993.

Hamilton was appointed manager of Northern Ireland in 1994, succeeding Billy Bingham. In the Euro 96 qualifiers, Northern Ireland were in contention for qualification and were only narrowly pipped to second place by the Republic of Ireland. The 1998 World Cup qualifiers provided a far worse return despite a promising early draw with Germany – who would later beat Northern Ireland for the first time in two decades – and Hamilton left the job at the end of the qualifiers.

In April 2000 he was appointed manager of Norwich City, but resigned on 4 December. He returned to Ipswich as coach in 2001, but left the club in 2002. In November 2006, he was appointed Technical Director of the Antigua and Barbuda Football Association.

Hamilton is now a media pundit working mainly with Eurosport, BBC Radio 5 Live, Setanta Sports, Today FM, Sky Sports and Anglia Television.

Honours

As a player
Ipswich Town
Texaco Cup: 1973

As a manager
Wigan Athletic
Football League Trophy: 1985

Individual
Ulster Footballer of the Year: 1970–71
Northern Ireland Football Writers' Association Player of the Year: 1970–71
Ipswich Town Hall of Fame: Inducted 2014

References

External links
 Bryan Hamilton profile at Ipswich Town Talk

ITFC coaches and trainers – Bryan Hamilton Pride of Anglia's website
Bryan Hamilton – Swindon Town FC website
Career information at ex-canaries.co.uk

1946 births
Association footballers from Belfast
Association footballers from Northern Ireland
NIFL Premiership players
Ulster Footballers of the Year
Northern Ireland Football Writers' Association Players of the Year
Lisburn Distillery F.C. players
Linfield F.C. players
Ipswich Town F.C. players
Northern Ireland international footballers
Everton F.C. players
Millwall F.C. players
Swindon Town F.C. players
Tranmere Rovers F.C. players
Tranmere Rovers F.C. managers
Football managers from Northern Ireland
Wigan Athletic F.C. managers
Leicester City F.C. managers
Shamrock Rovers F.C. guest players
Northern Ireland national football team managers
Norwich City F.C. managers
Living people
Association football midfielders